Elections to Kingston upon Thames Council were held on 2 May 2002.  The whole council was up for election with boundary changes reducing the number of councillors by two since the last election in 1998. The Liberal Democrats took overall control of the council.

Election result

|}

Ward results

Alexandra

Berrylands

Beverley

Canbury

Chessington North and Hook

Chessington South

Coombe Hill

Coombe Vale

Grove

Norbiton

Old Malden

St James

St Mark's

Surbiton Hill

Tolworth and Hook Rise

Tudor

References

Council elections in the Royal Borough of Kingston upon Thames
Kingston